Wong Nai Chau ( is the name of three islands in Hong Kong:

 Wong Nai Chau, within Yan Chau Tong Marine Park, in North District
 Wong Nai Chau, off Yeung Chau, in North District
 Wong Nai Chau in Sai Kung District